Vilhelm Storm  (28 September 1835 – 19 May 1913) was a Norwegian zoologist.

He was born in Arendal to priest Frederik Elias Storm and Emilie Fredrikke Cathrine Rønne. He was a brother of Martin Luther Storm and Thora Storm, and a cousin of Johan Storm and Gustav Storm.

He was appointed as conservator-restorer at the Royal Norwegian Society of Sciences and Letters in Trondheim for more than fifty years.

He is particularly known for his study of marine animals in Trondheimsfjorden.

Selected works
 Veiledning i Throndhjems Omegns Flora  (1870)
 Trondhjems Omegns Fugle  (1881)
 Throndhjemsfjordens Fiske  (1884)

References

1835 births
1913 deaths
People from Arendal
19th-century Norwegian zoologists
Royal Norwegian Society of Sciences and Letters
Members of the Norwegian Academy of Science and Letters